The Confession of Faith, popularly known as the Belgic Confession, is a doctrinal standard document to which many of the Reformed churches subscribe. The Confession forms part of the Three Forms of Unity of the Reformed Church, which are still the official subordinate standards of the Dutch Reformed Church. The confession's chief author was Guido de Brès, a preacher of the Reformed churches of the Netherlands, who died a martyr to the faith in 1567, during the Dutch Reformation. De Brès first wrote the Belgic Confession in 1559.

Terminology 
The name Belgic Confession follows the seventeenth-century Latin designation Confessio Belgica. Belgica referred to the whole of the Low Countries, both north and south, which today is divided into the Netherlands and Belgium.

Authorship and revisions 
De Brès was a Presbyterian and a Calvinist, and the initial text he prepared was influenced by the Gallic Confession. De Brès showed it in draft to others, including Hadrian à Saravia, Herman Moded, and Godfried van Wingen (Wingius). It  was revised by Franciscus Junius, who abridged the sixteenth article and sent a copy to Geneva and other churches for approval; and was presented to Philip II of Spain in 1562, in the hope of securing toleration for his Protestant subjects in the Low Countries. In 1566, the text of this confession was revised at a synod held at Antwerp. It was adopted by national synods held during the last three decades of the sixteenth century.

The Belgic Confession became the basis of a counter to the Arminian controversy that arose in the following century and Arminius opposed the notion that it could be used against his theology. Furthermore, contrary to popular thought and allegations to the contrary, Arminius maintained his affirmation of the Belgic Confession until his death in October 1609. The text was revised again at the Synod of Dort in 1618-19, was included in the Canons of Dort (1618–19), and adopted as one of the doctrinal standards to which all office-bearers and members of the Reformed churches were required to subscribe. This revision was drafted in the French language (1618–19).

Composition 
The Belgic Confession consists of 37 articles which deal with the doctrines of God (1-2, 8-13), Scripture (3-7), humanity (14), sin (15), Christ (18-21), salvation (16-17, 22-26), the Church (27-36), and the end times (37).

Editions and translations 
The first French edition is extant in four printings, two from 1561 and two from 1562. The Synod of Antwerp of September 1580 ordered a copy of the revised text of Junius to be made for its archives, to be signed by every new minister; this manuscript has always been regarded in the Belgic churches as the authentic document. The first Latin translation was made from Junius's text by Theodore Beza, or under his direction, for the Harmonia Confessionum (Geneva, 1581), and passed into the first edition of the Corpus et Syntagma Confessionum (Geneva, 1612). A second Latin translation was prepared by Festus Hommius for the Synod of Dort, 1618, revised and approved 1619; and from it was made the English translation in use in the Reformed (Dutch) Church in America. It appeared in Greek 1623, 1653, and 1660, at Utrecht.

See also 

 Marks of the Church (Protestantism)

References

Sources

External links 
 The Belgic Confession, published by the Christian Reformed Church in North America.

History of Christianity in Belgium
Three Forms of Unity
1561 works
Protestantism in Belgium
Reformed confessions of faith
Protestantism in the Netherlands